The Battle of Balangiga, also known as the Balangiga Encounter,  Balangiga Incident, or Balangiga Conflict, was a battle that occurred during the Philippine–American War between Philippine forces and American troops. The battle is sometimes termed the "Balingiga massacre," usually in accounts describing occupying American troops as victims of a massacre by townspeople. In response to the attack, United States General Jacob H. Smith ordered indiscriminate attacks on the island of Samar, openly disregarding General Order 100, killing 2,000 to 2,500 people. The battle is commemorated yearly as Balangiga Encounter Day in Eastern Samar.<ref>{{cite web | last =Menialo | first =Sarwell | title =Balangiga, E. Samar marks 119th Encounter Day== | website =Philippine News Agency | url=https://www.pna.gov.ph/articles/1116781 | access-date = 2022-02-23}}</ref>

Background
The battle was a military operation planned by Captain Eugenio Daza of the Philippine Republican Army, Area Commander of General Vicente R. Lukban's forces for Southeastern Samar, that took place in Balangiga in 1901 during the Philippine–American War. The attack was led by Valeriano Abanador the Jefe de la Policía (Chief of Police).

The Battle
The Battle of Balangiga took place in the town of Balangiga on Samar Island on September 28, 1901 wherein 70 members of the US 9th Infantry were ambushed by irregular forces made up of the Chief of Police, local police officers, local government officials, villagers. all officers were killed and many soldiers wounded. 48 men remained having 3 die later on shore including Cornelius F. Donahue Sr. of Massachussettes.

Aftermath
This battle was described as the "worst defeat of United States Army soldiers since the Battle of the Little Bighorn in 1876".

Legacy
The attack and the subsequent retaliation remains one of the longest-running and most controversial issues between the Philippines and the United States. Conflicting interpretations by American and Philippine historians have confused the issue. The attack has been termed Balangiga Massacre in many English language sources. However, Philippine historian Teodoro Agoncillo has asserted that the term Balangiga massacre properly refers to the burning of the town by U.S. forces following the attack and to retaliatory acts during the March across Samar: Other Philippine sources also employ this usage. In U.S. sources, however, the term massacre is used to refer to this attack.

Prelude
  
In the summer of 1901, Brigadier General Robert P. Hughes, who commanded the Department of the Visayas and was responsible for Samar, instigated an aggressive policy of food deprivation and property destruction on the island. The objective was to force the end of Philippine resistance. Part of his strategy was to close three key ports on the southern coast, Basey, Balangiga and Guiuan.

Samar was a major centre for the production of Manila hemp, the trade of which was financing Philippine forces on the island. At the same time United States interests were eager to secure control of the hemp trade, which was a vital material both for the United States Navy and American agro-industries such as cotton.

On August 11, 1901, Company C of the 9th U.S. Infantry Regiment, arrived in Balangiga—the third largest town on the southern coast of Samar island—to close its port and prevent supplies reaching Philippine forces in the interior, which at that time were under the command of General Vicente Lukbán. Lukbán had been sent there in December 1898 to govern the island on behalf of the First Philippine Republic under Emilio Aguinaldo. In late May of 1901, prior to the stationing of any Americans in Balangiga, town mayor Pedro Abayan had written to Lukban pledging to "observe a deceptive policy with [Americans] doing whatever they may like, and when a favorable opportunity arises, the people will strategically rise against them."

Relations between the soldiers and the townspeople were amicable for the first month of the American presence in the town; indeed it was marked by extensive fraternization between the two parties. This took the form of tuba (palm wine) drinking among the soldiers and male villagers, baseball games and arnis demonstrations. However, tensions rose due to several reasons: Captain Thomas W. Connell, commanding officer of the American unit in Balangiga, ordered the town cleaned up in preparation for a visit by the U.S. Army's inspector-general. However, in complying with his directive, the townspeople inadvertently cut down vegetation with food value, in violation of Lukbán's policies regarding food security. As a consequence, on September 18, 1901, around 400 guerrillas sent by Lukbán appeared in the vicinity of Balangiga. They were to mete sanctions upon the town officials and local residents for violating Lukbán's orders regarding food security and for fraternizing with the Americans. The threat was probably defused by Captain Eugenio Daza, a member of Lukbán's staff, and by the parish priest, Father Donato Guimbaolibot.

A few days later, Connell had the town's male residents rounded up and detained for the purpose of hastening his clean-up operations. Around 80 men were kept in two Sibley tents unfed overnight. In addition, Connell had the men's bolos and the stored rice for their tables confiscated. These events sufficiently insulted and angered the townspeople, and they planned revenge against the Americans.

A few days before the attack, Valeriano Abanador, the town's police chief, and Captain Daza met to plan the attack on the American unit. To address the issue of sufficient manpower to offset the Americans' advantage in firepower, Abanador and Daza disguised the congregation of men as a work force aimed at preparing the town for a local fiesta which, incidentally, also served to address Connell's preparations for his superior's visit. Abanador also brought in a group of "tax evaders" to bolster their numbers. Much palm wine was brought in to ensure that the American soldiers would be drunk the day after the fiesta. Hours before the attack, women and children were sent away to safety. To mask the disappearance of the women from the dawn service in the church, 34 men from Barrio Lawaan cross-dressed as women worshippers. These "women", carrying small coffins, were challenged by Sergeant Scharer of the sentry post about the town plaza near the church. Opening one of the coffins with his bayonet, he saw the body of a dead child who, he was told, was a victim of a cholera epidemic. Abashed, he let the women pass on. Unbeknownst to the sentries, the other coffins hid the bolos and other weapons of the attackers.

The issue of children's bodies merits further attention since there is much conflict between accounts by members of Company C. That day, the 27th, was the 52nd anniversary of the founding of the parish, an occasion on which an image of a recumbent Christ known as a Santo Entierro would have been carried around the parish. In modern times these Santo Entierros are enclosed in a glass case but at the time were commonly enclosed in a wooden box.

Attack on American soldiers

Between 6:20 and 6:45 in the morning of September 28, 1901, the villagers made their move. Abanador, who had been supervising the prisoners' communal labor in the town plaza, grabbed the rifle of Private Adolph Gamlin, one of the American sentries, and stunned him with a blow to the head. This served as the signal for the rest of the communal laborers in the plaza to rush the other sentries and soldiers of Company C, who were mostly having breakfast in the mess area. Abanador then gave a shout, signaling the other Philippine men to the attack and fired Gamlin's rifle at the mess tent, hitting one of the soldiers. The pealing of the church bells and the sounds from conch shells being blown followed seconds later. Some of the Company C troopers were attacked and hacked to death before they could grab their rifles; the few who survived the initial onslaught fought almost bare-handed, using kitchen utensils, steak knives, and chairs. One private used a baseball bat to fend off the attackers before being overwhelmed.

The men detained in the Sibley tents broke out and made their way to the municipal hall. Simultaneously, the attackers hidden in the church broke into the parish house and killed the three American officers there. An unarmed Company C soldier was ignored, as was Captain Connell's Philippine houseboy. The attackers initially occupied the parish house and the municipal hall; however, the attack at the mess tents and the barracks failed, with Pvt. Gamlin, recovering consciousness and managing to secure another rifle, caused considerable casualties among the Philippine forces. With the initial surprise wearing off and the attack degrading, Abanador called for the attackers to break off and retreat. The surviving Company C soldiers, led by Sergeant Frank Betron, escaped by sea to Basey and Tanauan, Leyte. The townspeople buried their dead and abandoned the town.

Of the 74 men in Company C, 36 were killed in action, including all its commissioned officers: Captain Thomas W. Connell, First Lieutenant Edward A. Bumpus and Major Richard S. Griswold. Twenty-two were wounded in action and four were missing in action. Eight died later of wounds received in combat; only four escaped unscathed.  The villagers captured about 100 rifles and 25,000 rounds of ammunition and suffered 28 dead and 22 wounded.

Retaliation

Captain Edwin Victor Bookmiller, the commander in Basey, sailed immediately with Company G, 9th Infantry Regiment for Balangiga aboard a commandeered coastal steamer, the SS Pittsburgh. Finding the town abandoned, they buried the American dead and set fire to the town.

Coming at a time when it was believed Filipino resistance to American rule had collapsed, the Balangiga attack had a powerful impact on Americans living in Manila. Men started to wear sidearms openly and Helen Herron Taft, wife of the American Governor-General of the Philippines William Howard Taft, was so distraught she required evacuation to Hong Kong.

The Balangiga incident provoked shock in the US public, too, with newspapers equating the massacre to George Armstrong Custer's last stand at the Battle of the Little Bighorn in 1876. Major General Adna R. Chaffee, military governor of the Philippines, received orders from US President Theodore Roosevelt to pacify Samar. To this end, Chaffee appointed Brigadier General Jacob H. Smith to Samar to accomplish the task.

General Smith instructed Major Littleton Waller, commanding officer of a battalion of 315 US Marines assigned to bolster his forces in Samar, regarding the conduct of pacification:

As a consequence of this order, Smith became known as "Howling Wilderness Smith";  he was also dubbed "Hell Roaring Jake" Smith, "The Monster", and "Howling Jake" by the press as a result. He further ordered Waller to kill all persons who were capable of bearing arms and in actual hostilities against the United States forces. When queried by Waller regarding the age limit of these persons, Smith replied that the limit was ten years of age.

Food and trade to Samar were cut off, intended to starve the revolutionaries into submission. Smith's strategy on Samar involved widespread destruction to force the inhabitants to stop supporting the guerrillas and turn to the Americans from fear and starvation. He used his troops in sweeps of the interior in search for guerrilla bands and in attempts to capture Philippine General Vicente Lukbán, but he did nothing to prevent contact between the guerrillas and the townspeople. American columns marched across the island, destroying homes and shooting people and draft animals. Littleton Waller, in a report, stated that over an eleven-day period his men burned 255 dwellings, shot 13 carabaos and killed 39 people.

The Judge Advocate General of the Army observed that only the good sense and restraint of the majority of Smith's subordinates prevented a complete reign of terror in Samar. The abuses outraged anti-Imperialist groups in the United States when these became known in March 1902.

The exact number of Filipinos killed by US troops will never be known. A population shortfall of about 15,000 is apparent between the Spanish census of 1887 and the American census of 1903, but how much of the shortfall is due to a disease epidemic and known natural disasters and how many due to combat is difficult to determine. Population growth in 19th century Samar was amplified by an influx of workers for the booming hemp industry, an influx which certainly ceased during the Samar campaign.

Exhaustive research in the 1990s made by British writer Bob Couttie as part of a ten-year study of the Balangiga massacre tentatively put the figure at about 2,500; David Fritz used population ageing techniques and suggested a figure of just more than 2,000 losses in males of combat age but nothing to support widespread killing of women and children. Some American and Filipino historians believe it to be around 50,000,  but those high estimates are thought to have resulted from typographical errors and misreading of documents. The rate of Samar's population growth slowed as refugees fled from Samar to Leyte, yet still the population of Samar increased by 21,456 during the war.

American military historians' opinions on the Samar campaign are echoed in the February 2011 edition of the US Army's official historical magazine, Army History Bulletin: "...the indiscriminate violence and punishment that U.S. Army and Marine forces under Brig. Gen. Jacob Smith are alleged to have unleashed on Samar have long stained the memory of the United States’ pacification of the Philippine Islands".

Commanding officers' courts-martial

Events in Samar resulted in prompt investigations. On April 15, 1902 the Secretary of War Elihu Root sent orders to relieve officers of duty and to court-martial General Smith. "The President (Theodore Roosevelt) desires to know and in the most circumstantial manner all facts, nothing being concealed, and no man being for any reason favored or shielded.  For the very reason that the President intends to back up the Army in the heartiest fashion in every lawful and legitimate method of doing its work, he also intends to see that the most rigorous care is exercised to detect and prevent any cruelty or brutality, and that men who are guilty thereof are punished".

Jacob H. Smith and Littleton Waller faced courts martial as a result of their heavy-handed treatment of Filipinos; Waller specifically for the execution of twelve Filipino bearers and guides. Waller was found not guilty, a finding that senior military officials did not accept. Smith was found guilty, admonished and forced to retire.

A third officer, Captain Edwin Forbes Glenn, was court-martialled for torturing Filipinos and was found guilty.

Factual disputes
Several factual inaccuracies in early published accounts have surfaced over the years as historians continue to re-investigate the Balangiga incident. These include:

Schott and Rey Imperial assert that Company C of the 9th US Infantry was sent to Balangiga in response to a request by its then-Mayor Pedro Abayan. This is based solely on a claim by George Meyer, a Company C survivor, in support of efforts to secure the Medal of Honor. Author Bob Couttie asserts that the American unit was sent there to close Balangiga's port.

James Taylor's account inspired another author, William T. Sexton, to write that the American soldiers were "butchered like hogs" in Soldiers in the Sun''. However, Eugenio Daza wrote, "The Filipino believes that the profanation of the dead necessarily brings bad luck and misfortune ... there was no time to lose for such acts [after the Balangiga attack]."

Gallery

Cultural references

See also

Balangiga bells, on the bells seized as spoils of war and returned to the Philippines in 2018
Eugenio Daza
Vicente Lukban
History of the Philippines (1898–1946)
Timeline of the Philippine–American War
Campaigns of the Philippine–American War

Notes

References

Further

,  (e-book)

1901 in the Philippines
Battles involving the United States
Battles of the Philippine–American War
Events that led to courts-martial
History of Eastern Samar
Massacres committed by the United States
September 1901 events
Visayan history
War crimes in the Philippines
United States war crimes
Massacres in 1901
Mass murder in 1901
Mass murder in the Philippines